Novemthree Siahaan (3 November 1998 – 14 September 2005) was a young Indonesian boy who had the rare condition gigantiform cementoma. According to the Financial Times, he had "the largest recorded facial tumour". The story of his life garnered much media attention when he was taken to Taiwan for treatment. His surgeries were filmed for international broadcast on the Discovery Health Channel. Siahaan was from Batam Island, Indonesia.

Media
Novemthree's story was shared on the Discovery Health Channel in 2005. Channel 5 covered Siahaan in a story titled "Extraordinary People: The Boy with a Tumour for a Face". He was profiled by the BBC.

References

1998 births
2005 deaths
People from the Riau Islands
Respiratory disease deaths in Indonesia
Indonesian children
Child deaths